The Snieznik Mountains, sometimes also Śnieżnik Mountains are a massif in the Eastern Sudetes on the border of the Czech Republic and Poland. On the Polish side it is largely covered by the protected area called Śnieżnik Landscape Park.

Major Polish towns and villages:
 Międzygórze
 Goworów
 Międzylesie
 Wilkanów
 Domaszków
 Sienna
 Kletno
 Bolesławów
 Nowa Morawa
 Jodłów
 Idzików

See also  
Great Moravia

Sudetes
Mountain ranges of Poland
Mountain ranges of the Czech Republic